John Hunter Padel (3 May 1913 – 24 October 1999) was a British psychoanalyst and classicist.

He was born in Carlisle, where his father Charles Padel was headmaster of Carlisle Grammar School.  His mother was Mòrag (née Hunter), 3rd daughter of William Hunter, MD. He was named after his ancestor, the surgeon John Hunter.  He gained a scholarship to Queen's College, Oxford.

He married Hilda Horatio Barlow, daughter of Sir Alan Barlow and Nora Darwin, in 1944.  She was a granddaughter of Charles Darwin. They had five children:

 Ruth Padel (born 1946), the poet
 Oliver James Padel (born 1948), mediaeval Cornish and Welsh historian
 Nicola Mary Padel (born 1951), psychiatrist and psychoanalytic psychotherapist
 Felix John Padel (born 1955), anthropologist
 Adam Frederick Padel (born 1958), histopathologist

External links 
 Obituary Psychoanalytic Psychotherapy, Volume 14, Number 1, 2000, pp. 81-82(2) by Jane Temperley
 Obituary in The Independent
 Obituary in The Guardian

1999 deaths
British psychoanalysts
1913 births
People from Carlisle, Cumbria
Alumni of The Queen's College, Oxford
20th-century British medical doctors